The 2002 World Group Play-offs decided which nations featured in World Group in the 2003 Fed Cup. The play-off winners went on to feature in World Group in 2003, while the losing nations joined Zonal Competition for 2003.

Australia vs. Netherlands

Sweden vs. Switzerland

Hungary vs. Argentina

United States vs. Israel

Czech Republic vs. Canada

China vs. Russia

Colombia vs. Japan
 was scheduled to play against  on 20–21 July in Bogotá, but the Japanese withdrew from their tie citing security concerns over the Colombian armed conflict. Colombia thus progressed to the 2003 World Group, while Japan was relegated to Zonal Competition.

Slovenia vs. Ukraine

References

See also
Fed Cup structure

World Group Play-offs